The Collaboration for the Advancement of Sustainable Medical Innovation (CASMI) (CASMI) is an organization hosted by University College London focused on the translation of bioscience into medical treatments.

John Tooke – Chair
Richard Barker – Founder

Recent publications

References

Medical research institutes in the United Kingdom